Donald Ross may refer to:
Donald A. Ross (1857–1937), Canadian politician
Donald Ross (golfer) (1872–1948), Scottish-born American golfer and golf course designer
Donald P. Ross (1902–1973), American horse racetrack and racing stable owner and breeder
Donald K. Ross (1910–1992), United States Navy officer and Medal of Honor recipient
Donald Ross (surgeon) (1922–2014), British thoracic surgeon
Donald Roe Ross (1922–2013), United States federal judge
Donald Ross, Lord Ross (born 1927), former Lord Justice Clerk of Scotland
Donald E. Ross (1930–2021), American engineer
Don Ross (ice hockey) (born 1942), American ice hockey player
Donald Kemp Ross, American lawyer and co-author with Ralph Nader of the book Action for a Change
Donald E. Ross (academic administrator), former president of Lynn University
Donald Ross (died 2018), American comedy screenwriter and playwright; husband of Patti Deutsch

See also
Don Ross (disambiguation)
Donaldo Ross (1904–1972), Uruguayan football player and coach